This is a list of places in Switzerland.

Cities, towns, and villages 
This list includes municipalities as well as other places with articles.

{| class="wikitable sortable"
! City                                 !! Canton                         !! Locallanguage !! Population !! Names in other languages
|-
| Aarau                            || AG                  || de|| align=right |  16,500 ||
|-
| L'Abbaye                         || VD                    || fr     || align=right |         ||
|-
| Aigle         || VD                    || fr     || align=right |         ||
|-
| Alpnach                          || OW                || de     || align=right |   5,100 ||
|-
| Appenzell       || AI   || de     || align=right |   5,200 ||
|-
| Apples       || VD                    || fr     || align=right |         ||
|-
| Arni                || AG                  || de     || align=right |   1,500 || 
|-
| Aubonne     || VD                    || fr     || align=right |         ||
|-
| Bad Ragaz                        || SG    || de     || align=right |         ||
|-
| Baden         || AG                  || de     || align=right |  16,000 ||
|-
| Ballens                          || VD                    || fr     || align=right |         ||
|-
| Basel                            || BS             || de     || align=right | 166,300 || fr:Bâle, it:Basilea, es:Basilea
|-
| Beckenried                       || NW               || de     || align=right |   2,900 ||
|-
| Belmont-sur-Lausanne             || VD                    || fr     || align=right |         ||
|-
| Bern                             || BE          || de     || align=right | 136,300 || de:Bern, fr:Bern, it:Berna, es:Berna
|-
| Berolle                          || VD                    || fr     || align=right |         ||
|-
| Bex                              || VD                    || fr     || align=right |         ||
|-
| Biel/Bienne                      || BE          || de, fr || align=right |  51,900 || de: Biel, fr: Bienne
|-
| Bière                      || VD                    || fr     || align=right |         ||
|-
| Bougy-Villars                    || VD                    || fr     || align=right |         ||
|-
| Bühler                           || AR  || de     || align=right |   1,600 ||
|-
| Buochs                           || NW               || de     || align=right |   5,200 ||
|-
| Cham           || ZG                     || de     || align=right |         ||
|-
| Cheseaux-sur-Lausanne            || VD                    || fr     || align=right |         ||
|-
| Chessel                          || VD                    || fr     || align=right |         ||
|-
| Chexbres                         || VD                    || fr     || align=right |         ||
|-
| Chur                             || GR              || de     || align=right |  32,900 || it: Coira, rm: Cuira, fr: Coire
|-
| Corbeyrier                       || VD                    || fr     || align=right |         ||
|-
| Crissier                         || VD                    || fr     || align=right |         ||
|-
| Cunter       || GR              || de, rm || align=right |         || de: Conters
|-
| Dallenwil                        || NW               || de     || align=right |   1,700 ||
|-
| Davos                            || GR              || de     || align=right |  11,000 || rm: Tavau 
|-
| Düdingen                         || FR                || de     || align=right |   7,000 || fr: Guin
|-
| Egg             || ZH        || de     || align=right |   7,800 ||
|-
| Emmetten                         || NW               || de     || align=right |   1,200 ||
|-
| Engelberg                        || OW                || de     || align=right |   3,600 ||
|-
| Ennetbürgen                      || NW               || de     || align=right |   4,000 ||
|-
| Ennetmoos                        || NW               || de     || align=right |   2,000 ||
|-
| Epalinges                        || VD                    || fr     || align=right |         ||
|-
| Erlenbach || ZH        || de     || align=right |   4,500 ||
|-
| Esslingen || ZH        || de     || align=right |   1,560 ||
|-
| Etoy           || VD                    || fr     || align=right |         ||
|-
| Féchy                            || VD                    || fr     || align=right |         ||
|-
| Feldbach   || ZH        || de     || align=right |         ||
|-
| Fribourg                         || FR      || fr, de || align=right |  36,400 || de:Freiburg, it:Friburgo, es:Friburgo
|-
| Gais                             || AR  || de     || align=right |   2,800 || 
|-
| Geneva                           || GE        || fr     || align=right | 171,000 || fr:Genève, it:Ginevra, de:Genf, es:Ginebra  
|-
| Gimel                            || VD                    || fr     || align=right |         ||
|-
| Giswil                           || OW                || de     || align=right |   3,400 ||
|-
| Gonten                           || AI   || de     || align=right |         ||
|-
| Grub                     || AR  || de     || align=right |   1,000 || 
|-
| Gryon                            || VD                    || fr     || align=right |         ||
|-
| Habsburg   || AG                  || de     || align=right |     368 ||  
|-
| Heiden       || AR  || de     || align=right |   4,000 || 
|-
| Hergiswil                        || NW               || de     || align=right |   5,300 ||
|-
| Herisau                          || AR  || de     || align=right |  15,600 || 
|-
| Hundwil                          || AR  || de     || align=right |   1,000 || 
|-
| Interlaken                       || BE          || de     || align=right |   5,200 ||  
|-
| Jouxtens-Mézery                  || VD                    || fr     || align=right |         ||
|-
| Kerns                            || OW                || de     || align=right |   5,300 ||
|-
| Lausanne                         || VD                    || fr     || align=right | 128,100 || de:Lausanne it:Losanna, es:Lausana
|-
| Lauterbrunnen                    || BE          || de     || align=right |         ||
|-
| Lavey-Morcles                    || VD                    || fr     || align=right |         ||
|-
| Le Chenit                        || VD                    || fr     || align=right |         ||
|-
| Leysin                           || VD                    || fr     || align=right |         ||
|-
| Le Chenit                        || VD                    || fr     || align=right |         ||
|-
| Locarno                          || TI                  || it     || align=right |         ||
|-
| Longirod                         || VD                    || fr     || align=right |         ||
|-
| Lucerne                          || LU       || de     || align=right |  61,000 || de: Luzern, fr: Lucerne, it: Lucerna
|-
| Lugano                           || TI                  || it     || align=right |  52,000 ||
|-
| Lungern                          || OW                || de     || align=right |   2,000 ||
|-
| Lutzenberg                       || AR  || de     || align=right |   1,200 || 
|-
| Männedorf                        || ZH        || de     || align=right |   9,235 ||
|-
| Meilen                           || ZH        || de     || align=right |  11,500 ||
|-
| Le Mont-sur-Lausanne             || VD                    || fr     || align=right |         ||
|-
| Montreux                         || VD                    || fr     || align=right |  22,900 || 
|-
| Neuchâtel                        || NE               || fr     || align=right |  31,571 || de: Neuenburg
|-
| Noville                          || VD                    || fr     || align=right |         ||
|-
| Oberdorf     || NW               || de     || align=right |   3,000 ||
|-
| Oberegg                          || AI   || de     || align=right |         ||
|-
| Ollon                            || VD                    || fr     || align=right |         ||
|-
| Ormont-Dessous                   || VD                    || fr     || align=right |         ||
|-
| Ormont-Dessus                    || VD                    || fr     || align=right |         ||
|-
| Paudex                           || VD                    || fr     || align=right |         ||
|-
| Prilly                           || VD                    || fr     || align=right |         ||
|-
| Pully                            || VD                    || fr     || align=right |         ||
|-
| Rapperswil                       || SG    || de     || align=right |   7,750 || 
|-
| Rehetobel                        || AR  || de     || align=right |   1,700 || 
|-
| Reichenau || GR              || de     || align=right |         ||
|-
| Renens                           || VD                    || fr     || align=right |  18,000 || 
|-
| Rennaz                           || VD                    || fr     || align=right |         ||
|-
| Reute                            || AR  || de     || align=right |     670 || 
|-
| Roche                || VD                    || fr     || align=right |         ||
|-
| Rolle                            || VD                    || fr     || align=right |   4,148 || 
|-
| Romanel-sur-Lausanne             || VD                    || fr     || align=right |         ||
|-
| Rüte                             || AI   || de     || align=right |         ||
|-
| Sachseln                         || OW                || de     || align=right |   4,400 ||
|-
| Sarnen                           || OW                || de     || align=right |   9,400 ||
|-
| Schaffhausen                     || SH  || de     || align=right |  34,200 || it: Sciaffusa
|-
| Schlatt-Haslen                   || AI   || de     || align=right |         ||
|-
| Schleinikon                      || ZH        || de     || align=right |     664 ||
|-
| Schönengrund                     || AR  || de     || align=right |     470 || 
|-
| Schwellbrunn                     || AR  || de     || align=right |   1,500 || 
|-
| Schwyz                           || SZ        || de     || align=right |         || it: Svitto
|-
| Schwende                         || AI   || de     || align=right |         ||
|-
| Sion           || VS                  || fr     || align=right |  27,200 || de: Sitten
|-
| Solothurn                        || SO     || de     || align=right |  15,300 || fr: Soleure, it: Soletta
|-
| Speicher   || AR  || de     || align=right |   4,000 || 
|-
| St. Gallen                       || SG    || de     || align=right |  75,200 || fr: St-Gall, it: San Gallo
|-
| St. Moritz                       || GR              || de, rm || align=right |   5,600 || rm: San Murrezan 
|-
| Stans                            || NW               || de     || align=right |   7,300 ||
|-
| Stansstad                        || NW               || de     || align=right |   4,500 ||
|-
| Stein                   || AR  || de     || align=right |   1,400 || 
|-
| Teufen                           || AR  || de     || align=right |   5,600 || 
|-
| Thal           ||  SG   || de     || align=right |   5,000 || 
|-
| Thalwil                          || ZH        || de     || align=right |  16,000 || 
|-
| Thun                             || BE          || de     || align=right |  38,200 ||
|-
| Trogen                           || AR  || de     || align=right |   1,900 || 
|-
| Urnäsch                          || AR  || de     || align=right |   2,300 || 
|-
| Uzwil                            || SG    || de     || align=right |  12,100 || 
|-
| Vevey                            || VD                    || fr     || align=right |  15,500 || 
|-
| Villeneuve      || VD                    || fr     || align=right |         ||
|-
| Wald                     || AR  || de     || align=right |     900 || 
|-
| Waldstatt                        || AR  || de     || align=right |   1,700 || 
|-
| Walzenhausen                     || AR  || de     || align=right |   2,100 || 
|-
| Weiach                           || ZH        || de     || align=right |   1,014 ||
|-
| Wildhaus                         || SG    || de     || align=right |   1,258 ||
|-
| Winterthur                       || ZH        || de     || align=right |  87,000 ||
|-
| Wolfenschiessen                  || NW               || de     || align=right |   2,000 ||
|-
| Wolfhalden                       || AR  || de     || align=right |   1,700 || 
|-
| Yvorne                           || VD                    || fr     || align=right |         ||
|-
| Zug                              || ZG           || de     || align=right |  21,700 || fr: Zoug, it: Zugo
|-
| Zürich                           || ZH        || de     || align=right | 365,000 || de:Zürich, it:Zurigo, es:Zúrich
|}

See also
List of cities in Switzerland
List of municipalities of Switzerland

References

 
Switzerland